The California Wine and Liquor Store is located in Fairchild, Wisconsin. It was listed on the National Register of Historic Places in 1982 and on the State Register of Historic Places in 1989.

References

Commercial buildings on the National Register of Historic Places in Wisconsin
National Register of Historic Places in Eau Claire County, Wisconsin
Early Commercial architecture in the United States
Brick buildings and structures
Commercial buildings completed in 1896